Faedo may refer to:

 Faedo, Trentino, populated place in Trentino in the northern Italian region Trentino-Alto Adige/Südtirol
 Faedo (Cudillero), parish in the Cudillero municipality, within the province and autonomous community of Asturias, in northern Spain.
 Faedo (surname), surname
 Faedo Valtellino, municipality in the Province of Sondrio in the Italian region Lombardy

See also 

 Fado (disambiguation)